Shaved doors refers to a vehicle whose doors do not have handles on the outside of the vehicle in order to present in a smooth, clean, look.  It was pioneered by legendary customiser Harry Westergard in California.  The modification also increases security as there is no keyhole to pick or handle to grab.

Often called autolocs, or autoloc doors, after a popular manufacturer of such doors.

They are popular on hot rods, street rods, muscle cars, tuned cars (mostly Japanese), trucks, and mini trucks. It is also a traditional modification on many lead sleds, dating back to the 1940s. A solenoid is used to open the door. This solenoid can be triggered by button or remote. They can also be opened mechanically with a hidden cable release.

References

Automotive styling features
Vehicle modifications
Car doors